Mel Epstein (March 25, 1910 in Dayton, Ohio – December 14, 1994) was an American film director and producer. He produced several films, including Secret of the Incas and Alaska Seas. He also produced episodes of the 1961 television series The Asphalt Jungle.

External links

New York Times Biography of Mel Epstein .

American film directors
Businesspeople from Dayton, Ohio
1910 births
1994 deaths
20th-century American businesspeople
Film producers from Ohio